Kuhgir-e Sofla (also Romanized as Kūhgīr-e Soflá, Kūgīr-e Soflá, and G`ūgīr-e Soflá) is a village in Kuhgir Rural District, Tarom Sofla District, Qazvin County, Qazvin Province, Iran. At the 2006 census, its population was 595, in 146 families.

References 

Populated places in Qazvin County